Streptomyces cacaoi is a bacterium species from the genus of Streptomyces. Streptomyces cacaoi produces polyoxine.

See also 
 List of Streptomyces species

References

Further reading

External links
Type strain of Streptomyces cacaoi at BacDive -  the Bacterial Diversity Metadatabase

cacaoi
Bacteria described in 1948